Todd Sampson's Body Hack (also known as Body Hack) is an Australian documentary television series which first premiered on 4 October 2016 on Network Ten.

The series was renewed for a second season in November 2016 which was set to air in 2017, however the series aired in 2018 and was titled Todd Sampson's Body Hack 2.0.

A third season was officially renewed by Network 10 in November 2018 and premiered on 25 June 2019 at 8:40 pm.

Season four commenced on Tuesday, 15 September 2020.

Broadcast
The series first premiered on Tuesday, 4 October 2016 at 9:00pm. The second season premiered on Thursday, 31 May 2018 at 8:45pm. The third season premiered on Tuesday, 25 June 2019 at 8:40pm. The fourth season premiered on Tuesday, September 15, 2020 at 7:30pm.

Synopsis
Filmed around the world over a period of six months, Todd will take on some of the biggest challenges of his life as he embarks on an epic exploration, investigating some of the world's most extraordinary people. He deconstructs and decodes how these incredible people live, what they do differently from the rest of us and how this impacts the human body.

Series overview

Episodes

Season 1 (2016)

Season 2 (2018)

Season 3 (2019)

Season 4 (2020)

References

External links
 
 

2010s Australian documentary television series
2016 Australian television series debuts
Network 10 original programming
Todd Sampson